The 1918–19 team finished with a record of 10–4. It was the 2nd year for head coach Elton J. Rynearson. Eddie Powers was the team captain.

Roster

Schedule

|-
!colspan=9 style="background:#006633; color:#FFFFFF;"| Non-conference regular season

|-
|}

References

https://emueagles.com/sports/2018/11/7/2018-19-mens-basketball-media-guide.aspx?id=943

Eastern Michigan Eagles men's basketball seasons
Michigan State Normal